Lachlan Adrian Russell Richards (21 December 1900 – 9 April 1930) was an Australian rules footballer who played with North Melbourne in the Victorian Football League (VFL).

In 1930 Richards was working for the British Phosphate Commission on Ocean Island when he died after being hit by a runaway truck whilst waiting to return to Australia.

Notes

External links 

1900 births
1930 deaths
Australian rules footballers from Victoria (Australia)
North Melbourne Football Club players
Road incident deaths in Kiribati
Truck road incident deaths